Zaire is a given name and surname. Notable people with the name include:

Given name
 Zaire Anderson (born 1992), American football player
 Zaire Bartley (born 1998), Jamaican footballer
 Zaire Franklin, American football player
 Zaire Lewis (born 1980), member of hip hop producer duo Keelay and Zaire

Surname
 Malik Zaire (born 1995), American media personality and former football player
 Nicolas Zaïre (born 1986), Martinique footballer

See also
Ziaire, given name